Acanthuridae are the family of surgeonfishes, tangs, and unicornfishes. The family includes about 86 extant species of marine fish living in tropical seas, usually around coral reefs. Many of the species are brightly colored and popular in aquaria.

Morphology

The distinctive characteristic of the family is that they have scalpel-like modified scales, one or more on either side of the peduncle of the tail. The spines are dangerously sharp and may seriously injure anyone who carelessly handles such a fish. The dorsal, anal, and caudal fins are large, extending for most of the length of the body. The mouths are small and have a single row of teeth adapted to grazing on algae.

Surgeonfishes sometimes feed as solitary individuals, but they often travel and feed in schools. Feeding in schools may be a mechanism for overwhelming the highly aggressive defense responses of small territorial damselfishes that vigorously guard small patches of algae on coral reefs.

These fishes may grow quickly in aquaria, so average growth size and suitability should be checked before adding them to any marine aquarium.

Evolution and fossil record
There are several extinct genera known from fossils dating from the Eocene to Miocene:

Eocene genera
Proacanthurus
Tylerichthys
Gazolaichthys
Naseus
Tauichthys
Eorandallius
Metacanthurus

Oligocene genera
Glarithurus
Caprovesposus
Arambourgthurus
?Eonaso

Miocene genera
Marosichthys

Etymology and taxonomic history
The name of the family is derived from the Greek words akantha and oura, which loosely translate to "thorn" and "tail", respectively. This refers to the distinguishing characteristic of the family, the "scalpel" found on the caudal peduncle. In the early 1900s, the family was called Hepatidae.

In the aquarium 

Tangs are very sensitive to disease in the home aquarium. However, if the tang is fed enough algae and the aquarium is properly maintained disease should not be a problem. It is usually necessary to quarantine the animals for a period before introducing them to the aquarium.

When considering a tang for an aquarium it is important to consider the size to which these fish can grow.

Many also suggest adding aggressive tangs to the aquarium last as they are territorial and may fight and possibly kill other fish.

Tangs primarily graze on macroalgae from genera such as Caulerpa and Gracilaria, although they have been observed in an aquarium setting to eat meat-based fish foods. A popular technique for aquarists, is to grow macroalgae in a sump or refugium. This technique not only is economically beneficial, but serves to promote enhanced water quality through nitrate absorption. The growth of the algae can then be controlled by feeding it to the tang.

Gallery

References

External links
 
 
 

 
Perciformes families
Marine fish families
Taxa named by Charles Lucien Bonaparte
Articles which contain graphical timelines